USCGC Forward (WMEC-911) is a United States Coast Guard medium endurance cutter. Named for Walter Forward, fifteenth United States Secretary of the Treasury, she was constructed by Robert Derecktor Shipyard Incorporated, Middletown, Rhode Island was delivered in May 1989, and commissioned 4 August 1990. USCGC Forward (WMEC-911) and USCGC Legare (WMEC-912) were commissioned in a joint ceremony in Portsmouth, Virginia.

History

2010s
On 12 January 2010, USCGC Forward was at Guantanamo Bay Naval Base when the 2010 Haiti earthquake occurred.  She was ordered to assist in the humanitarian relief efforts, and was the first American vessel to arrive in Port-au-Prince the following morning.

USCGC Forward was set to wrap a deployment in the Caribbean and was ported in Guantanamo Bay in order to onload fuel, supplies, and debrief the USCGC Tahoma prior to returning to home port. The Tahoma was set to take over operations in the area and the Forward was set to return home. In lieu of returning home, the CGC Forward and her crew set sail to Haiti to initialize the U.S. response to the massive efforts that would eventually take place in the following weeks.

References

External links

 USCGC Forward (WMEC 911) home page

Ships of the United States Coast Guard
Famous-class cutters
Ships built in Middletown, Rhode Island
2010 Haiti earthquake relief
1990 ships